The Roman Catholic Archdiocese of Jinan is an archdiocese located in the city of Jinan (Shandong) in China.

History

 September 3, 1839: Established as Apostolic Vicariate of Shantung from the Diocese of Beijing
 December 2, 1885: Renamed as Apostolic Vicariate of Northern Shantung
 December 3, 1924: Renamed as Apostolic Vicariate of Tsinanfu
 April 11, 1946: Promoted as Metropolitan Archdiocese of Jinan

Leadership
 Vicars Apostolic of Scian-Ton (Shantung 山東) (Roman Rite)
 Bishop Ludovico Maria Besi (dei Conti) Besi (10 Jan 1840 Appointed - 3 Jun 1848)
 Bishop Luigi Moccagatta, O.F.M. (1844 – September 27, 1870)
 Vicars Apostolic of Northern Shantung 山東北境 (Roman Rite)
 Bishop Efrem Giesen, O.F.M. (申永福) (July 18, 1902 – 1919)
 Bishop Adalberto Schmücker, O.F.M. (瑞明軒) (August 2, 1920 – December 3, 1924)
 Vicars Apostolic of Tsinanfu 濟南府 (Roman Rite)
 Bishop Adalberto Schmücker, O.F.M. (瑞明軒) (December 3, 1924 – 1927)
 Bishop Cyrillus Jarre, O.F.M. (杨恩赉) (later Archbishop) (May 18, 1929 – April 11, 1946)
 Archbishops of Jinan 濟南 (Roman rite)
 Archbishop Cyrillus Jarre, O.F.M. (杨恩赉) (April 11, 1946 – March 8, 1952)
 Fr. John P’ing Ta-kuam, O.F.M. (Apostolic Administrator November 7, 1952 – 1984)
 Archbishop James Zhao Zi-ping (1997 - May 18, 2008)
 Archbishop Joseph Zhang Xianwang (2008–present)

Suffragan dioceses
 Caozhou 曹州
 Qingdao 青島
 Yanggu 陽穀
 Yantai 煙台
 Yanzhou 兖州
 Yizhou 沂州
 Zhoucun 周村

Sources

 Catholic Hierarchy

Roman Catholic dioceses in China
Religious organizations established in 1839
Roman Catholic dioceses and prelatures established in the 19th century
1839 establishments in China
Religion in Shandong
Jinan